The 2011 FIFA Club World Cup final was the final match of the 2011 FIFA Club World Cup, an association football tournament hosted by Japan. It was the eighth final of the FIFA Club World Cup, a FIFA-organized tournament between the winners of the six continental confederations as well as the host nation's league champions.

The final was played between CONMEBOL's champion Santos and UEFA's champion Barcelona. Barcelona defeated Santos 4–0 and won their second FIFA Club World Cup, two years after they won their first one in 2009.

The match was billed as a showdown between Barcelona forward Lionel Messi and the 19-year-old Santos forward Neymar. Messi won the "duel" by scoring two goals in the final and being named man of the match as well as player of the tournament.

Road to final

Team news
Barcelona forward David Villa missed the final after he broke his shinbone in the semi-final victory over Al-Sadd. He was injured six minutes before half-time after appearing to land awkwardly; Barcelona announced after the match that he had suffered a "fracture to the tibia in his left leg" that could see him sidelined for four to five months.

Match

Summary

In the first half, Barcelona were extremely dominant. Messi and Thiago forced saves from Santos goalkeeper Rafael Cabral in the 12th minute. Messi then scored with a chip over Cabral in the 17th minute. Seven minutes later, Xavi scored a second with a strike from just inside the penalty area. Santos came back with a short-range effort by Borges that was saved by Barcelona 'keeper Víctor Valdés, before Cesc Fàbregas hit the post two minutes later and then scored Barcelona's third goal just before the half ended.

In the second half, Santos improved and teenage star Neymar finally had a chance for Santos in the 57th minute when he was one-on-one with Valdés, but the shot was saved. Barcelona's Dani Alves hit the post in the 79th minute, before Messi rounded the goalkeeper in the 82nd minute to cap the scoring with his second goal.

Details

Statistics

See also
 FC Barcelona in international football competitions
 Santos FC in South America

References

External links

FIFA Club World Cup Japan 2011, FIFA.com

World
Final
2011
Santos FC matches
FC Barcelona matches
Sports competitions in Yokohama
World
2010s in Yokohama